Local government in the United Kingdom has origins that pre-date the United Kingdom itself, as each of the four countries of the United Kingdom has its own separate system. For an overview, see Administrative geography of the United Kingdom. For details, see:

Local government in England
Local government in Northern Ireland
Local government in Scotland
Local government in Wales 

For the history of local government in each country, see:

History of local government in England
History of local government in Northern Ireland
History of local government in Scotland
History of local government in Wales

For local government entities in each country, see 
:Category:Local authorities of England
:Category:Local authorities of Northern Ireland
:Category:Local authorities of Scotland
:Category:Local authorities of Wales

See also 
List of articles about local government in the United Kingdom
Political make-up of local councils in the United Kingdom